Llorente (IPA: [ˌʎoˈrɛntɛ]), officially the Municipality of Llorente, is a 3rd class municipality in the province of Eastern Samar, Philippines. According to the 2020 census, it has a population of 21,459 people.

The municipality was named after Julio Aballe Llorente (1863–1940), a Cebuano Politician who was instrumental in the establishment of the American Government in Cebu. He was the 1st Governor of Cebu, who once became a Governor of Samar in the early 1900s.

Geography

Barangays
Llorente is politically subdivided into 33 barangays.

Climate

Demographics

Economy

References

External links
 [ Philippine Standard Geographic Code]
 Philippine Census Information
 Local Governance Performance Management System

Municipalities of Eastern Samar